Carex cruenta is a tussock-forming species of perennial sedge in the family Cyperaceae. It is native to parts of Asia, from Pakistan in the west to south central parts of China in the east.

Description

Taxonomy
The species was described by the botanist Christian Gottfried Daniel Nees von Esenbeck in 1834 as a part of the work Contributions to the Botany of India. The type specimen was collected by Nathaniel Wallich in an area of alpine meadow in the Kumaon division of Uttar Pradesh in India. It has one synonym; Carex heterolepis as described by Johann Otto Boeckeler in 1888.

Distribution
The range of the plant extends from northern parts of Pakistan in the west through the Himalayas including Nepal and Tibet and into southern parts of central China. It is found in subalpine or subarctic environments.

See also
List of Carex species

References

cruenta
Plants described in 1834
Taxa named by Christian Gottfried Daniel Nees von Esenbeck
Flora of Pakistan
Flora of China
Flora of Nepal
Flora of Tibet